Brindley Heath railway station served the civil parish of Brindley Heath, Staffordshire, England from 1939 to 1959 on the Chase Line.

History 
The station opened to the public on 26 August 1939 by the London, Midland and Scottish Railway, although it opened earlier on 3 August for Bank Holiday specials from the RAF base. It closed to both passengers and goods traffic on 6 April 1959. These dates correspond closely with the opening and closing of the nearby RAF Hednesford.

References

External links 

Disused railway stations in Staffordshire
Former London, Midland and Scottish Railway stations
Railway stations in Great Britain opened in 1939
Railway stations in Great Britain closed in 1959
1939 establishments in England
1959 disestablishments in England